The 30% Club is a campaign group of business chairpersons and CEOs taking action to increase gender diversity on boards and senior management teams. It was established in the United Kingdom in 2010 by Helena Morrissey with the aim of achieving a minimum of 30% female representation on the boards of FTSE 100 companies. That target was reached in September 2018. The club now also has chapters in Australia, Brazil, Canada, East Africa, GCC, Hong Kong, Ireland, Italy, Japan, Malaysia, Southern Africa, Turkey and the U.S. In 2015 Brenda Trenowden was appointed as the new lead for the UK chapter and as Global Chair of the campaign, reflecting its increased reach and scale since launch. As of June 2019, the leadership structure of the campaign further evolved in response to its ongoing success and international influence, with Ann Cairns joining as global co-chair of the campaign. The Club continues to expand its global footprint and has exceeded its original UK goal, with 32.5% women sitting on FTSE 100 Boards as at September 2019.

Approach 
The 30% Club adopts a collaborative and objective approach. It supports a voluntary approach to realizing meaningful and sustainable change and rejects mandatory quotas. The campaign aims to align its goals with individual company efforts and existing groups through measurable goals and collaboration with senior business leaders. The campaign focuses on amplifying the business case for gender diversity for better decision-making.

References

External links

Feminist organisations in the United Kingdom
2010 establishments in England
London Stock Exchange
Women's rights in the United Kingdom